Clark William Goff (December 6, 1917 – February 3, 1998) was an American college and professional football player who was a tackle in the National Football League (NFL) for a single season in 1940.  Goff played college football for the University of Florida, and thereafter, he played professionally for the NFL's Pittsburgh Pirates (now known as the Pittsburgh Steelers).

Early years 

He was born in North Braddock, Pennsylvania.  Goff attended Scott Township High School in North Braddock.

College career 

Goff accepted an athletic scholarship to attend the University of Florida in Gainesville, Florida, where he played for coach Josh Cody's Florida Gators football team from 1937 to 1939.  Goff was the Gators' team captain and earned third-team All-Southeastern Conference (SEC) honors during his 1939 senior season.

Professional career 

The Pittsburgh Pirates selected Goff in the fifth round (33rd pick overall) of the 1940 NFL Draft, and he played at left tackle for the Pirates during the  season.  During his single season with the Pirates, he played in all eleven regular season games, and started five of them.

See also 

 Florida Gators football, 1930–39
 List of Pittsburgh Steelers players
 List of Florida Gators in the NFL Draft
 List of University of Florida alumni

References

Bibliography 
 Carlson, Norm, University of Florida Football Vault: The History of the Florida Gators, Whitman Publishing, LLC, Atlanta, Georgia (2007).  .
 Golenbock, Peter, Go Gators!  An Oral History of Florida's Pursuit of Gridiron Glory, Legends Publishing, LLC, St. Petersburg, Florida (2002).  .
 Hairston, Jack, Tales from the Gator Swamp: A Collection of the Greatest Gator Stories Ever Told, Sports Publishing, LLC, Champaign, Illinois (2002).  .
 McCarthy, Kevin M.,  Fightin' Gators: A History of University of Florida Football, Arcadia Publishing, Mount Pleasant, South Carolina (2000).  .
 McEwen, Tom, The Gators: A Story of Florida Football, The Strode Publishers, Huntsville, Alabama (1974).  .
 Nash, Noel, ed., The Gainesville Sun Presents The Greatest Moments in Florida Gators Football, Sports Publishing, Inc., Champaign, Illinois (1998).  .

1917 births
1998 deaths
People from North Braddock, Pennsylvania
Sportspeople from the Pittsburgh metropolitan area
Players of American football from Pennsylvania
American football tackles
Florida Gators football players
Pittsburgh Steelers players